Viropa is an unincorporated community and coal town in Harrison County, West Virginia, United States. Their post office  closed in 1930.

Etymology

The community's name is a portmanteau of Virginia, Ohio and Pennsylvania.

References 

Unincorporated communities in West Virginia
Coal towns in West Virginia
Unincorporated communities in Harrison County, West Virginia